Andrea Hatle (born 11 June 1965) is a German luger. She competed in the women's singles event at the 1984 Winter Olympics.

References

External links
 

1965 births
Living people
German female lugers
Olympic lugers of West Germany
Lugers at the 1984 Winter Olympics
People from Teplice